Tregenza A. Roach (born August 7, 1959) is a Kittitian-American politician, attorney, and former journalist. Since 2019, Roach has been serving as the 12th Lieutenant Governor of the United States Virgin Islands. Roach previously was a senator at the Legislature of the Virgin Islands from 2013 to 2019.

Early life and education
Tregenza Roach migrated from Saint Kitts and Nevis to the United States Virgin Islands at the age of eight to join his parents, Victor and Iona Roach, who had made Saint Thomas their home years earlier. After attending St. Thomas Seventh-day Adventist School and V.I. public schools, Roach graduated from Charlotte Amalie High School.

Roach attended the College of the Virgin Islands (now known as the University of the Virgin Islands) as a Holstein–Lewis scholar. He earned a Bachelor of Journalism at the University of Missouri. Roach holds a Juris Doctor from the University of Connecticut School of Law.

Career 
Roach started his career as a reporter for the Virgin Islands Daily News, rising to news editor. Roach was a law clerk at various U.S. and V.I. governmental offices, practiced in the Territorial Court's Civil and Family divisions and was an associate attorney at Bornn Bornn Handy and Rashid. He has been a member of the Virgin Islands Bar since 1991.

Virgin Islands legislature 
As a member of the Virgin Islands legislature, Roach championed legislation that would make attending the University of the Virgin Islands tuition-free for undergraduate students. The legislation was ultimately approved by the legislature in December 2018.

Lieutenant Governor of the United States Virgin Islands 
In the 2018 Virgin Islands gubernatorial election, Roach was selected by Democratic nominee Albert Bryan as his running mate, and were elected in November 2018.

Travels
 May 1–5, 2019: Attended United Nations Caribbean Regional Seminar in Grenada.
 June 23–28, 2019: Attended National Association of Insurance Commissioners (N.A.I.C.) Executive Committee Interim Meeting, and Mid-Year Commissioners Roundtable Session in Rockport, Maine.
 July 6–8, 2019: Roach left the territory on personal matter. 
 September 9–15, 2019: Attended Guam Commission on Decolonization conference in Guam.
 September 20–27, 2019: Roach left the territory for personal time.
 December 5–10, 2019: Attended the National Association of Insurance Commissioners (NAIC) Fall National Meeting in Austin, Texas.

Personal life 
Roach is also an author and poet whose work has been included in several collections of contemporary Caribbean poetry. He was awarded the Margaret Walker Fiction Prize by the Detroit Writers Guild in 1999 and the St. Thomas & St. John Library Association's Distinguished Caribbean Author Award in 2009. On April 27, 2022, Roach tested positive for Covid-19 after being notified about an staff member in his office with a positive case.

References

1959 births
21st-century American politicians
Democratic Party of the Virgin Islands politicians
Lieutenant Governors of the United States Virgin Islands
Living people
Saint Kitts and Nevis emigrants to the United States Virgin Islands
Senators of the Legislature of the United States Virgin Islands
University of Missouri alumni
University of the Virgin Islands alumni
University of Connecticut School of Law alumni
United States Virgin Islands writers